Düvecik, is a neighbourhood, former village, located in Canik, Samsun, Turkey.

History 
In accordance with Treaty of Lausanne, 105 people migrated to the district in 1931 from Chrysoupoli.  These people were mostly Balkan Turks. After a while people from Samsun and nearby cities moved into the village. With the building of residential areas nearby and growing population, a Plebiscite was held on 27 December 2009. After the Plebiscite Düvecik was accepted as a neighborhood.

Geography 
8 kilometers away from the city center.

Population

Economy 
The economy is mostly depended on agriculture and livestock. Although most of the young population prefer working in the city center.

Infrastructure 
There is an elementary school in the neighbourhood. Water supply network and sewer infrastructure are present in the neighbourhood. There isn't any medical facility located in Düvecik.  Also, there is electricity and phone network connected to neighbourhood.

References 
https://web.archive.org/web/20151002201931/http://beyazgazete.com/haber/2009/12/27/mahalle-olabilmek-icin-sandik-basina-gittiler-19584.html

https://guncelgercek.wordpress.com/2010/05/19/samsun-merkez-ve-koylerindeki-yunanistan-mubadillerinin-yerlesimi/

Populated places in Samsun Province